St. Modwen Properties limited is a British-based property investment and development business specialising in the regeneration and remediation of brownfield land and urban environments. It is headquartered in Birmingham and has a network of four regional offices across the UK. It was listed on the London Stock Exchange until it was acquired by The Blackstone Group in August 2021.

History
The business was founded by Sir Stanley Clarke CBE and his brother-in-law Jim Leavesley in 1966 as a property development business called Clarke St. Modwen. In 1986 the management reversed the business into Redman Heenan International plc, a listed former engineering concern that had become a shell company. At that time, in 1986, the name was changed to St. Modwen Properties plc. In the 1980s the company developed the Stoke-on-Trent Garden Festival site.

In January 2004 the company acquired a 230-acre site at Longbridge from Phoenix Venture Holdings. The land at the Longbridge site was obtained by St Modwen Properties at a fraction of the actual value after the company paid a £100,000 property commission to a firm run by an associate of the Phoenix Four.

In January 2013 the company entered into a development agreement for the New Covent Garden Market site in London and in March 2013 the company entered into a development agreement for the first phase of Swansea University's Bay Campus.

In June 2016 the company entered into development agreements for the Spray Street Quarter in Woolwich, a regeneration project in joint venture with Notting Hill Housing to create a mixed-use development; Chippenham Gateway in Wiltshire, a 79-acre site to be developed into a 1 million sq ft industrial park; and Stanton Cross, Wellingborough, a project involving 1 million sq ft of industrial accommodation.

In July 2016 the company established a private rented sector (PRS) business unit.

The company agreed to be acquired by The Blackstone Group in a £1.24 billion (€1.4 billion) transaction in May 2021.

Operations
The company has three business units:
 St. Modwen Homes
 St. Modwen Industrial & Logistics
 Strategic Land and Regeneration

The company owned a property portfolio valued at £0.9 billion at 30 November 2020.

References

External links

St. Modwen Homes Website

Companies based in Birmingham, West Midlands
Real estate companies established in 1966
Property companies of the United Kingdom
Companies formerly listed on the London Stock Exchange
1966 establishments in the United Kingdom